Peter Kalinke (born 21 December 1936) is a German footballer. He played in seven matches for the East Germany national football team from 1960 to 1961.

References

1936 births
Living people
East German footballers
East Germany international footballers
Place of birth missing (living people)
Association footballers not categorized by position